The Genetic and Evolutionary Computation Conference (GECCO) is the premier conference in the area of genetic and evolutionary computation. GECCO has been held every year since 1999, when it was first established as a recombination of the International Conference on Genetic Algorithms (ICGA) and the Annual Genetic Programming Conference (GP).

GECCO presents the latest high-quality results in genetic and evolutionary computation. Topics of interest include: genetic algorithms, genetic programming, evolution strategies, evolutionary programming, estimation of distribution algorithms, memetic algorithms, hyper-heuristics, evolutionary robotics, evolvable hardware, artificial life, ant colony optimization algorithms, swarm intelligence, artificial immune systems, digital entertainment technologies,  evolutionary art, evolutionary combinatorial optimization, metaheuristics, evolutionary multi-objective optimization, evolutionary machine learning, search-based software engineering, theory, real-world applications, and more.

Other important conferences in the field are IEEE Congress on Evolutionary Computation (CEC), Parallel Problem Solving from Nature (PPSN) and EvoStar (a group name for four co-located conferences, EuroGP, EvoCOP, EvoMUSART, and EvoApplications).

GECCO is the main annual conference of the Special Interest Group on Genetic and Evolutionary Computation (SIGEVO), which is a Special Interest Group (SIG) of the Association for Computing Machinery (ACM).

External links
SIGEVO
A list of links to all GECCO websites since 1999

Evolutionary computation
Association for Computing Machinery conferences
Computer science conferences